Laura Charameda (born June 5, 1964) is an American cyclist.

Life and career 
Charameda was born in Marshall, Michigan.

Charameda raced in the Tour de France in 1988.

Charameda competed at the 1993 UCI Road World Championships, winning the bronze medal in the women's road race event. In 1995, she won the Thüringen Ladies Tour. She also competed at the 1996 UCI Road World Championships.

References

External links 

1964 births
Living people
People from Marshall, Michigan
Cyclists from Michigan
American female cyclists